Bela is the Census Town in Bhandara Taluka of Bhandara District of Maharashtra, India.

References

Cities and towns in Bhandara district